Hans-Günther Plücken (born 15 November 1954) is a retired German football player. He spent three seasons in the Bundesliga with Hamburger SV, Hertha BSC and Bayer Uerdingen.

Honours
 European Cup finalist: 1979–80
 Bundesliga champion: 1978–79

References

External links
 

1954 births
Living people
German footballers
SG Union Solingen players
Hamburger SV players
Hertha BSC players
KFC Uerdingen 05 players
Bundesliga players
2. Bundesliga players

Association football midfielders
20th-century German people